Dragon Plus may refer to:

 Velikiy Drakon, a Russian former video game magazine
 Dragon+, the online replacement for Dragon (magazine) from Wizards of the Coast for their Dungeons & Dragons role-playing game